The 2005 World Short Track Speed Skating Championships took place between 9 and 11 March 2005 in Beijing, China. The World Championships are organised by the ISU which also run world cups and championships in speed skating and figure skating.

Results

Men

* First place is awarded 34 points, second is awarded 21 points, third is awarded 13 points, fourth is awarded 8 points, fifth is awarded 5 points, sixth is awarded 3 points, seventh is awarded 2 points, and eighth is awarded 1 point in the finals of each individual race to determine the overall world champion. The relays do not count for the overall classification.

Women

† In the final of the Women's 3000 m relay, the South Korean and Japanese teams were disqualified, thus the French team was awarded the bronze medal from its time in the heats.

* First place is awarded 34 points, second is awarded 21 points, third is awarded 13 points, fourth is awarded 8 points, fifth is awarded 5 points, sixth is awarded 3 points, seventh is awarded 2 points, and eighth is awarded 1 point in the finals of each individual race to determine the overall world champion. The relays do not count for the overall classification.

Medal table

External links
 ISU Results

World Short Track Speed Skating Championships
2005 in short track speed skating
International speed skating competitions hosted by China
World Short Track Speed Skating Championships
Sports competitions in Beijing
March 2005 sports events in Asia
2000s in Beijing